The Ozark Mountain Daredevils is the debut album by the American country rock band The Ozark Mountain Daredevils. Sporting a patchwork quilt cover that gave some indication of its eclectic musical content, it contained the #25 hit single "If You Wanna Get to Heaven," plus many other laid-back originals from the southern Missouri natives.

Track listing
"Country Girl" (Randle Chowning) – 3:16
"Spaceship Orion" (Larry Lee) – 3:11
"If You Wanna Get to Heaven" (Steve Cash, John Dillon) – 3:04
"Chicken Train" (Steve Cash) – 3:37
"Colorado Song" (Steve Cash, John Dillon) – 5:05
"Standin' on the Rock" (John Dillon) – 3:54
"Road to Glory" (Randle Chowning) – 4:55
"Black Sky" (Steve Cash) – 3:08
"Within Without" (Larry Lee) – 4:25
"Beauty in the River" (John Dillon) – 3:55

Charts

Personnel
Steve Cash - harmonica, harpsichord, percussion, vocals
John Dillon - guitar, mandolin, fiddle, dulcimer, autoharp, keyboards, percussion, vocals
Larry Lee - guitar, keyboards, drums, percussion, vocals, saw
Randle Chowning - guitar, harmonica, vocals
Michael Granda - bass, percussion, vocals
Buddy Brayfield - piano, keyboards
Jack Black - backing vocals
Elizabeth Anderson - backing vocals
Sidney Cash - backing vocals
Janet Lee - backing vocals
Donald Bromage - backing vocals

Production
Producer: Glyn Johns/David Anderle
Recording Engineer: Glyn Johns
Art Direction: Mike Doud
Photography: Bill Higgins, Jeremy Parkin
Liner notes: Mike Dempsey

References

The Ozark Mountain Daredevils albums
1973 debut albums
Albums produced by Glyn Johns
Albums produced by David Anderle
A&M Records albums